Gorka-2 is a rural locality (a village) in Zadneselskoye Rural Settlement, Ust-Kubinsky District, Vologda Oblast, Russia. The population was 9 as of 2002.

Geography 
The distance to Ustye is 38 km, to Zadneye is 14 km. Grifonikha is the nearest rural locality.

References 

Rural localities in Tarnogsky District